Charles Richman was the commissioner of the New Jersey Department of Community Affairs from 2015 until January 2018, when he was succeeded by Sheila Oliver, who was appointed by the Governor to head the department in her role as Lieutenant Governor of New Jersey. Richman also served as the acting commissioner of the department during three New Jersey gubernatorial administrations.

Richman has held positions in multiple state agencies in New Jersey during his career. In 1977, he was Acting Administrator of the State Energy Office. He was Assistant Commissioner of Energy in 1979.

Richman is a career DCA employee and was first appointed deputy commissioner in early 2005 by Commissioner Susan Bass Levin. When Levin resigned in June 2005 to become operations director for the campaign of Gov. Jon Corzine, Governor Codey appointed Richman, a resident of Freehold Township, as DCA's acting commissioner. Richman served as acting commissioner until January 2006, when Governor Corzine reappointed Levin as commissioner. 

In February 2012, Commissioner Rich Constable named Richman deputy commissioner. Upon Constable's resignation in 2015, Richman was named acting commissioner.

See also
Governorship of Chris Christie

References

External links

Charles A. Richman, New Jersey Department of Community Affairs.

Year of birth missing (living people)
Living people
American University alumni
Commissioners of the New Jersey Department of Community Affairs
People from Freehold Township, New Jersey